"Growing Pains" is the first episode of the fourth season of The Vampire Diaries's, premiering October 11, 2012 on The CW.

Plot
Elena Gilbert (Nina Dobrev) wakes up, confused and disoriented. Stefan Salvatore (Paul Wesley) begins to explain to Elena that she was in an accident. Damon proceeds to interject that Matt is alive, she is in transition, and she must feed or die. Stefan tries to give her hope that Bonnie might find a way out by the end of the day.

In the kitchen, Stefan and Damon get into an argument over giving Elena hope about something that's never happened in the "history of vampirism." Stefan responds that Damon "wasn't there the day she looked me in the eye and told me that she never wanted this." 
Meanwhile, Elena is experiencing the sensitivity to sound and light. Even the buzzing from the electricity through the lightbulbs are maddening. In an attempt to unscrew one of them, Elena proceeds to crush it. Jeremy comes to check in on her. He does not want her to complete the transition: "I need my sister, not one of them." Back in her room, Elena remembers the moment when Damon confessed his love to her and said how his brother deserves her more than him.

Pastor Young comes to town and proceeds to kick everyone out of their assignments. Meredith's blood bank is confiscated and all of the vervain in town is collected, including the ones in the Salvatore's home. Meredith, Sheriff Liz Forbes, and Mayor Carol Lockwood are all removed from their positions. Caroline is attacked with vervain while trying to escape her home and Rebekah is shot and staked while having an altercation with Damon. Klaus, while in the body of Tyler, learns of Caroline's capture when Carol Lockwood calls him to check on him. He immediately leaves to save Caroline, leaving his sister bound in the overturned police van. Rebekah identifies him as Klaus when he says "keep them busy, little sister." Pastor Young also shows up at Elena's home in order to capture Stefan, but also Elena, assuming she is still human, to use as bait to bring Damon. He takes them to his home where Stefan and Rebekah are locked up. Elena soon joins them when her transition/vampire reactions to light and her thirst for blood give away that she might be a vampire. Rebekah relishes the pleasure of getting to watch Elena die all over again.

While in the woods, Caroline, who is so excited to have her boyfriend back, is ready to become romantic in the woods. Klaus responds, "wrong time, wrong place, wrong equipment, love." Caroline, picking up on the use of the word "love" recognizes that Klaus is in Tyler's body and proceeds to yell at him.

Bonnie is trying to ask the witches for help, but they are not responding. She proceeds to explain to Jeremy that she might be able to do it on her own by going to the other side where the witches have free rein and bring Elena back. After convincing Jeremy, who immediately rejects the idea, Bonnie incites the spell. Jeremy sees the black veins climbing up Bonnie's hands as she recites her incantations, but he is unable to get her to stop the spell. She dies and goes to the other side where she proceeds to try and bring Elena back. Bonnie takes Elena by the hands and tells her to come back, but she is stopped by her grandmother. Bonnie's grandmother warns her that if she touches dark magic again, there will be severe consequences. She immediately instructs Bonnie to leave immediately. Bonnie comes back to the world of the living and is angry that she was not able to save Elena.

When Klaus returns, he demands that she put him back in his own body. Bonnie explains that she is unable to, given the consequences and her grandmother's warning. Klaus then threatens to kill Tyler by digging his fingers into his chest and proceeding to rip out his heart. Bonnie agrees to tap into the dark magic once more to put Klaus back. Tyler slumps to the floor, and Bonnie is once again seeing her grandmother. This time her grandmother explains that Bonnie is receiving her punishment. She watches her grandmother die all over again, much in the same way she died in season one.

Back at the pastor's home, Elena and Stefan share their moment of love and final goodbyes. Elena tells Stefan that she needs blood, indicating that she has decided to complete the transition. Rebekah, in a surprising moment of empathy, is able to get one of the guards to come close enough to her to throw him against Stefan's cell. Stefan slams the cop's head against the bars multiple times and throws his body towards Elena's cell. Elena takes every last bit of energy to dab her fingers in the blood leaking from the gash on the guard's head and licks it.

Outside, Matt is asking Damon to kill him as Damon kicks him around. Elena jumps in, tackling Damon to the ground, and growls at him to leave Matt alone. Elena asks Damon why he never told her about the times she was compelled. Damon spits back "would it have changed anything?" When she asks if he would have followed her for Matt to be saved, Damon responds that he would absolutely not, so that Elena could live the life she always wanted: "Because I'm that selfish, but you know that," referencing the other compulsion when Damon confessed his love for Elena. Stefan takes Matt and feeds him his blood. Matt tells Stefan to stop saving him. Stefan retorts that it was Elena's choice that Matt be saved first. Stefan is the one living the rest of his life with the fact that it is his fault Elena is a vampire. Stefan tells Matt that he better earn every day of his life.

When Rebekah confronts Klaus for choosing Caroline over her, she angrily points out how she has always stood by his side. Realizing Klaus is still obsessed with hybrids, she then destroys Elena's blood bags that Klaus has been preserving. As Elena is a vampire, her blood will not work in making more hybrids. Klaus then says in rage that she is not his family anymore and she means nothing, angrily walking away after breaking her neck.

On the Salvatore roof, Stefan tries to comfort Elena, but she doesn't need him telling her that everything is going to be okay. He gives Elena the daylight ring Bonnie made her earlier in the day, just in case.

The episode ends with Pastor Young and several other council members in his house with large pile of vervain. The pastor then unhooks the gas hose from the gas stove, telling them that he has been chosen to lead them in a movement. The surprised council watches him tell them that "They will pass through the gates and all be reunited in eternity". The pastor then pulls out a lighter. He then says, "Friends, we are the beginning," before igniting the lighter and causing an explosion, destroying all the vervain and, killing himself and everybody inside.

Reception

Ratings 

When the episode aired on October 11, 2012, the episode was viewed by 3.48 million American viewers and garnered a 1.6 rating in the 18-49 demographic. This was 7% above last season's premiere (The Birthday) which garnered a 1.5 rating in the 18-49 demographic and up 13% in Women 18–34. The episode came joint 3rd in its timeslot, losing to The X Factor and The Big Bang Theory but tying with ABC's drama, Last Resort and the episode outrated both of NBC's 8-9pm comedies, 30 Rock and Up All Night.

References

External links 
 Recap from Official Website

2012 American television episodes
The Vampire Diaries (season 4) episodes